Telgrafın Tellerine Kuşlar Mı Konar, (Turkish: Do birds land on telegram wires?)  or  Νικολάκη μου (el) is a Turkish and Greek folkloric tune (Tsifteteli).

Original form
The original form of the  Tsifteteli (Kanto) was popular in İstanbul.

See also
Tsifteteli

References

Turkish music
Turkish songs
Greek songs
Songwriter unknown
Year of song unknown